Black Rock, Blackrock, Black Rocks, etc. may refer to:

Places

Australia 
 Black Rock, South Australia, a hamlet on the Black Rock Plains
 Black Rock, Victoria, a suburb of Melbourne
 Blackrock, Queensland, a locality in Shire of Hinchinbrook
 Black Rock (Western Australia), in Two Peoples Bay Nature Reserve
 Black Rocks, Queensland, rocky islets south of Bramble Cay in the Torres Strait
 Black Rocks, South Australia, an islet off the western Eyre Peninsula in Avoid Bay Islands Conservation Park
 South Black Rock, an island off north-west Tasmania

Canada 
Black Rock, Colchester County, Nova Scotia
Black Rock, Cumberland County, Nova Scotia
 Black Rock, Kings County, Nova Scotia
Black Rock, Victoria County, Nova Scotia
 Blackrock Mountain (Alberta), Alberta
 Irish Commemorative Stone, also known as The Black Rock, a monument to Irish typhoid victims in Montreal

Ireland 
 Blackrock, Cork, suburb of Cork city
 Blackrock, Dublin, southern coastal suburb of Dublin city
 Blackrock railway station, railway station serving the Dublin city suburb
 Black Rock, Co. Limerick, mountain among the Ballyhouras
 Blackrock, County Louth, a village
 Blackrock Island, County Mayo, rocky islet toward Blacksod Bay, County Mayo
 Black Rock Mountain, County Wexford

South Georgia (Southern Atlantic)
 Black Rock, South Georgia, low rock well off Shag Rocks 
 Black Rocks, South Georgia, near Framnaes Point

United Kingdom 
 Black Rock (Brighton and Hove), an area near Brighton Marina, South East England
 Black Rock, a crossing of the River Severn at Portskewett, Monmouthshire
 Black Rock Gorge, through which the Allt Graad flows in Scotland
 Black Rocks (Derbyshire), England

United States 
(sorted by state)
 Black Rock, Arizona, wilderness area of northwest Arizona
 Black Rock, Arkansas, city in Lawrence County
 Black Rocks, a geological feature in the Temescal Mountains, in Riverside County, California
 Black Rock Falls, waterfall in Uvas Canyon County Park, near Morgan Hill, California
 Black Rock, Bridgeport, Connecticut, a neighborhood
 Black Rock Harbor, adjacent harbor in Bridgeport, Connecticut
 Black Rock State Park, near Watertown, Connecticut
 Black Rock Turnpike, a name for Connecticut State Route 58 in southwestern Connecticut
 Black Rock Mountain State Park, near Mountain City, Georgia
 Black Rock, Hawaii, an alternative name for Kāohikaipu, a volcanic island near Oahu
 Black Rock, Indiana, an extinct community in Warren County
 Black Rock (Bristol County, Massachusetts)
 Black Rock, a pillar in Montana
 Black Rock, Buffalo, former town and now a neighborhood in Buffalo, New York
 Black Rock Forest, nature preserve in the Hudson highlands of Orange County, New York
 Black Rock Desert, region of northwestern Nevada
 Black Rock, New Mexico, a census-designated place in northwestern New Mexico
 Black Rock, Buffalo, in New York
 Black Rock, Oregon, community in Polk County
 Blackrock, Pennsylvania, an unincorporated community in York County, Pennsylvania
 Blackrock, Rhode Island
 Black Rock (Great Salt Lake), a historic landmark in Tooele County, Utah
 Black Rock Desert volcanic field, Utah
 Black Rock, Millard County, Utah, a ghost town
 Blackrock, Washington
 Black Rock (West Virginia), a mountain

Elsewhere
 Black Rock Peak, Hangzhou, Zhejiang Province, China
 Black Rocks (Saint Kitts), a notable rock formation on the northeastern coast of Saint Kitts
 Black Rock (Heard Island)

Arts, entertainment, and media

Fictional entities
 Black Rock, a beached ship on the TV show Lost; see Mythology of Lost
 Black Rock Shooter, a 2008 Japanese media franchise based on the eponymous female character
 Blackrock (comics), an adversary of Superman's in DC Comics 
 Blackrock Mountain, a mountain in the Warcraft universe, mostly seen in World of Warcraft
 G. B. Blackrock, a character in the Transformers comic book series

Films
 Black Rock (2012 film), a 2012 film starring Katie Aselton, Lake Bell, and Kate Bosworth
 Blackrock (film), a 1997 Australian film based on the 1992 play

Literature
 Black Rock (novel), by Steve Harris
 Blackrock (play), 1992 Australian play inspired by the real-life rape and murder of schoolgirl Leigh Leigh

Music
 Black Rock (band), dance production duo from France 
 Black Rock (James Blood Ulmer album), 1982
 Black Rock (Joe Bonamassa album), 2010
 Black Rock (Onyx album), 2018
 Progressive soul, a music genre
 Psychedelic soul, a music genre

Buildings and structures 
 Black Rock, a nickname for the CBS Building in New York City
 Black Rock Airport, New Mexico
 Black Rock Dam (Schuylkill River), Pennsylvania
 Black Rock Halt railway station, near Criccieth, Wales; closed in 1976
 Black Rock Lock, the terminal lock on the Black Rock Canal, part of the Erie Canal
 Blackrock railway station, in Blackrock, Dublin
 Blackrock Castle, in Blackrock, Cork
 BlackRock Center for the Arts, in Germantown, Maryland
 Blackrock Clinic, in Blackrock, Dublin
 The Black Rock, a memorial to Irish typhus victims in Goose Village, Montreal

Businesses and organisations 
 Black Rock City, LLC, the U.S.-based organization behind the annual Burning Man festival
 Black Rock Coalition, a U.S.-based organization promoting black musicians
 Black Rock Studio, a U.K. video games developer
 BlackRock, an American global investment management firm based in New York City
 Blackrock College, a secondary school in Blackrock, County Dublin, Ireland
 Blackrocks Brewery, a craft brewery in Marquette, Michigan, United States

Sports
 Black Rock FC, an American soccer club
 Black Rock Football Club, Australia
 Black Rock Yacht Club, Australia
 Blackrock College RFC, rugby club associated with Blackrock College in Blackrock, Dublin, Ireland
 Blackrock GAA (Blackrock Gaelic Athletic Association), also known as Blackrock Hunting Club, in Blackrock, Cork, Ireland
 Blackrock Rugby Festival, a schools' rugby festival hosted by St. Mary's School in Nairobi, Kenya

Other uses 
 Black Rock (hen), variety of domestic chicken
 Blackrock (geology), type of limestone

See also
 Black Hill (disambiguation)
 Black Hills (disambiguation)
 Black metal
 Black Mountain (disambiguation)
 Black Mountains (disambiguation)
 Black Stone (disambiguation)
 Black Stone, a Muslim object of reverence in Mecca
 Blakroc, a 2009 collaboration project between the band The Black Keys and a number of hiphop and R&B artists
 Blackrock railway station (disambiguation)
 Blackstone (disambiguation)
 Blackstones (disambiguation)
 Lapis Niger (Latin: "Black Stone"), ancient shrine in Rome